The 1949 NCAA baseball season, play of college baseball in the United States organized by the National Collegiate Athletic Association (NCAA) began in the spring of 1949. The season progressed through the regular season and concluded with the 1949 NCAA baseball tournament and 1949 College World Series. The College World Series, held for the third time in 1949, consisted of four remaining teams in the NCAA Tournament and was held in Wichita, Kansas, at Wichita Municipal Stadium as a double-elimination tournament. Texas claimed the championship by sweeping the four team tournament.

Conference winners 
This is a partial list of conference champions from the 1949 season. Each of the eight geographical districts chose, by various methods, the team that would represent them in the NCAA Tournament. Conference champions had to be chosen, unless all conference champions declined the bid.

Conference standings 
The following is an incomplete list of conference standings:

NCAA tournament 

The 1949 season marked the third NCAA Baseball Tournament, which consisted of eight teams divided into four regions. Each region held a three-game series to determine the four teams that advance to the College World Series, which was held in Wichita, Kansas. The four teams played a double-elimination format, with Texas sweeping the tournament and defeating Wake Forest in the final.

Award winners

All-America team

References